The Lucas L6 is a French all-metal monoplane design for homebuilding by Emile Lucas.

Design and development
The Lucas L6 is a tandem two-seat all-metal low-wing cantilever monoplane with a retractable tricycle landing gear. Two variants were designed: the L-6A long-span motor glider version and the short-span L-6B.

Variants
L6A
Long-span variant with either a Limbach L2000 or Lycoming O-235 engine.
L6B
Short-span variant which can be fitted with a Lycoming O-235 upwards to the Lycoming O-360.

Specifications (L6B with Lycoming O-235)

References

Notes

1990s French sport aircraft
Lucas aircraft
Homebuilt aircraft
Single-engined tractor aircraft
Low-wing aircraft
Aircraft first flown in 1991